Robert Hirschfeld (June 8, 1942 – December 4, 2009) was an American actor and author.  He was best known for playing Officer Leo Schnitz on Hill Street Blues from 1981 to 1985. He also appeared in the films Cradle Will Rock (1999) and Escape from Alcatraz (1979).

Hirschfeld died in Dobbs Ferry, New York, at the age of 67.

Bibliography

Filmography

References

External links

1942 births
2009 deaths
Male actors from New York (state)
American male film actors
American male television actors
20th-century American male actors